The Roman Catholic Church in the Democratic Republic of the Congo (formerly Belgian Congo, Zaire; also known as Congo-Kinshasa) is composed only of a Latin hierarchy, united in the national Episcopal Conference of the Democratic Republic of the Congo (French Conférence Episcopale Nationale du Congo (CENCO) ), comprising six ecclesiastical provinces, each under a Metropolitan Archbishop, and a total of 41 suffragan dioceses, each under a bishop.

There are no Eastern Catholic, pre-diocesan or other exempt jurisdictions.

There are no titular sees. The only defunct jurisdiction without proper current successor see, Diocese of Bikoro, is nevertheless preserved in its heir Mbandaka-Bikoro's title.

There is an Apostolic Nunciature to the Democratic Republic of Congo as papal diplomatic representation (embassy-level), in the national capital Kinshasa.

Current Latin dioceses

Ecclesiastical Province of Bukavu 
 Metropolitan Archdiocese of Bukavu
Diocese of Butembo-Beni
Diocese of Goma
Diocese of Kasongo
Diocese of Kindu
Diocese of Uvira

Ecclesiastical Province of Kananga 
 Metropolitan Archdiocese of Kananga
Diocese of Kabinda
Diocese of Kole
Diocese of Luebo
Diocese of Luiza
Diocese of Mbujimayi
Diocese of Mweka
Diocese of Tshilomba
Diocese of Tshumbe

Ecclesiastical Province of Kinshasa 
 Metropolitan Archdiocese of Kinshasa
Diocese of Boma
Diocese of Idiofa
Diocese of Inongo
Diocese of Kenge
Diocese of Kikwit
Diocese of Kisantu
Diocese of Matadi
Diocese of Popokabaka

Ecclesiastical Province of Kisangani 
 Metropolitan Archdiocese of Kisangani
Diocese of Bondo
Diocese of Bunia
Diocese of Buta
Diocese of Doruma-Dungu
Diocese of Isangi
Diocese of Isiro-Niangara
Diocese of Mahagi-Nioka
Diocese of Wamba

Ecclesiastical Province of Lubumbashi 
 Metropolitan Archdiocese of Lubumbashi
Diocese of Kalemie-Kirungu
Diocese of Kamina
Diocese of Kilwa-Kasenga
Diocese of Kolwezi
Diocese of Kongolo
Diocese of Manono
Diocese of Sakania-Kipushi

Ecclesiastical Province of Mbandaka-Bikoro 
 Metropolitan Archdiocese of Mbandaka-Bikoro
Diocese of Basankusu
Diocese of Bokungu-Ikela
Diocese of Budjala
Diocese of Lisala
Diocese of Lolo
Diocese of Molegbe

See also 
 Catholic Church in the Democratic Republic of the Congo
 List of Catholic dioceses (structured view)

Sources and external links 
 GCatholic.org - date for all sections.
 Catholic-Hierarchy entry.

Democratic Republic of the Congo
Catholic dioceses